Thomas Bellew (11 April 1943 – 28 October 1995) was an Irish politician. He was elected to Dáil Éireann as a Fianna Fáil Teachta Dála (TD) at the February 1982 general election for the Louth constituency. He lost his seat at the November 1982 general election. He unsuccessfully contested the 1987 and 1992 general elections as an independent candidate. Tom Bellew Avenue in Dundalk is named after him.

References

1943 births
1995 deaths
Fianna Fáil TDs
Local councillors in County Louth
Members of the 23rd Dáil
Politicians from County Louth